Hector was launched at Bristol in 1781 as a West Indiaman. A new owner in 1802 sailed Hector as a slave ship. She made one complete voyage as a slave ship before a French privateer captured her on her second slave voyage after Hector had disembarked her slaves.

Career
Hector entered Lloyd's Register (LR) in 1783. Between 1781 and 1783, LR conflated her with the Bristol-built . The following data is for Orange Valley.

The following data is for Hector, with the data for 1783 still reflecting the confusion.

Captain Thomas Harvey acquired a letter of marque on 30 January 1795.

Slave voyages
1st slave voyage (1802–1803): Captain Joseph Williams sailed from Liverpool on 3 June 1802. Hector acquired slaves at Calabar and arrived at Trinidad on 9 January 1803 with 339 slaves. She sailed for Liverpool on 20 February and arrived there on 8 April. She had left Liverpool with 37 crew members and had suffered seven crew deaths on the voyage.

2nd slave voyage (1803–loss): War with France had resumed shortly before Hector had returned to Liverpool from her first slave voyage. Before Captain Williams sailed again he acquired a letter of marque on 23 May 1803. Hector sailed from Liverpool on 8 June. She acquired her slaves at Calabar and arrived at Demerara on 14 January 1804 with 300 slaves. She sailed for Liverpool on 27 February. She had left Liverpool with 37 crew members and she had suffered seven crew deaths on her voyage. Parr sold Hector while she was on her way to Demerara.

Fate
Lloyd's List reported on 4 May 1804 that privateers had captured , Cannell, master, Skerrett, master, and Hector, Williams, master, and taken them into Guadeloupe. Lloyd's List reported that the three were sailing to Liverpool from Demerara. However, Sarah was not. She was coming into Demerara with slaves from Africa. Her captor took her to Guadeloupe.

Caldicot Castles captor was the privateer Grand Decide, which had brought two prizes into Guadeloupe, suggesting that she may also have been the captor of Hector.

In 1804, 30 British slave ships were lost. Only one was lost homeward-bound after having disembarked slaves.

Notes

Citations

References
 
 
 

1781 ships
Ships built in Bristol
Age of Sail merchant ships of England
Liverpool slave ships
Captured ships